Oral-facial-digital syndrome 1 protein is a protein that in humans is encoded by the OFD1 gene.

Human chromosomal region Xp22.3-p21.3 comprises the area between the pseudoautosomal boundary and the Duchenne muscular dystrophy gene (MIM 300377). This region harbors several disease loci, including OFD1 (MIM 311200), CFNS (MIM 304110), DFN6 (MIM 300066), and SEDT (MIM 313400). It also contains a region of homology with both the short and the long arms of the Y chromosome and undergoes frequent chromosomal rearrangements.[supplied by OMIM]

See also
 Orofaciodigital syndrome 1
 Simpson–Golabi–Behmel syndrome

References

External links
  GeneReviews/NCBI/NIH/UW entry on Oral-Facial-Digital Syndrome Type I

Further reading